Jul med tradition is a 1975 Anita Lindblom Christmas album. Sven-Olof Walldoffs's choir and band contribute, and the album was later rerelased at the EMI label in 1985 to cassette tape and in 1985 to CD.

Track listing
Betlehems stjärna
Hosianna
Luciasången (Natten går tunga fjät)
Var hälsad, sköna morgonstund
Stilla natt (Stille Nacht, heilige Nacht)
Det är en ros utsprungen (Es ist ein Ros entsprungen)
Rudolf med röda mulen (Rudolph the Red-Nosed Reindeer) 
Medley: dancing games
Morsgrisar är vi allihopa
Vi äro musikanter
Räven raskar över isen
Mormors lilla kråka
Karusellen
Kring julgranen
Julbocken
White Christmas

References 

Anita Lindblom albums
1975 Christmas albums
Christmas albums by Swedish artists
Schlager Christmas albums